The Ghanaian Times is a government-owned daily newspaper published in Accra, Ghana. The newspaper was established in 1957. It has a circulation of 80,000 copies and is published six times per week.

History
The newspaper was formerly known as the Guinea Press Limited. It was established by the first President of Ghana, the late President Dr. Kwame Nkrumah in 1957, as a printing press for The Convention People's Party.
After his overthrow in military coup in 1966, The Guinea Press was taken over as a state property by the National Liberation Council Decree 130 of 1968. By an instrument of Incorporation-Act 363, 1971, Guinea Press was changed to the New Times Corporation. The Act also repealed the 
National Newspapers (Guinea Press Limited – Interim Reconstitution Decree) which acquired it as state property. That Act was given further recognition by the provision of Provisional National Defence Council Law 42.

References

Publications established in 1958
Newspapers published in Ghana
1958 establishments in Ghana
English-language newspapers published in Africa
Mass media in Accra
Ghanaian news websites